Zainab Shabbir (born 19th October 1998) is a Pakistani television actress. She is best known for appearing in Sanwari, Piya Naam Ka Diya, Malaal-e-Yaar, Haqeeqat, Makafaat, Dikhawa, Mehar Posh, and Yaar Na Bichray. She’s currently working on the ongoing drama Mushkil that airs on Geo TV.

Career 
In 2018, Shabbir was picked by Momina Duraid and Sultana Siddiqui of the Hum Network to play the supporting role of Ishmal in Hum TV's Maa Sadqay. She then played the lead role of Ujala in Sanwari opposite Usama Khan for which she earned the Best Soap Actress nomination at Hum Awards. Shabbir coloured her skin a few shades darker for the project’s 180-episode run. Her character, a plain-clothed, middle-class girl, was reminiscent of Sanam Saeed’s Kashaf in the iconic 2012 play Zindagi Gulzar Hai. 

In 2019, she was cast as the strong and independent female protagonist in LTN’s Emaan that ran for 73 episodes. She also appeared as Aaliya in Saleem Ghanchi's Piya Naam Ka Diya with Saniya Shamshad and Farhan Malhi, and as Minhal in Asad Jabal's Malaal-e-Yaar alongside Azekah Daniel and Mirza Zain Baig. The latter was a commercial and critical success. Shabbir made an episodic special appearance in the anthology series Haqeeqat.

In 2020, Zainab appeared in a supporting role of Ayat in 7th Sky Entertainment's Mehar Posh that emerged as one of the highest rated Pakistani shows of 2020. She worked with acclaimed actors Ayeza Khan, Danish Taimoor, Ali Abbas, Sania Saeed and Rehan Sheikh during the series run.

Television

Special appearances

References

External links 

1998 births
Living people
Pakistani television actresses
21st-century Pakistani actresses
Actresses from Karachi